Club Lake is a glacial salt-water lake in the central part of Breidnes Peninsula in the Vestfold Hills of Princess Elizabeth Land in Antarctica.

It was mapped from air photos taken by U.S. Navy Operation Highjump, 1946–47, and remapped by Australian National Antarctic Research Expeditions (1957–58) who gave the name.

It is next west of Lake Jabs, and it is 1.5 nautical miles (3 km) northeast of Collerson Lake.

References 

Lakes of Princess Elizabeth Land
Ingrid Christensen Coast